The Eastern Zone was one of the three regional zones of the 1956 Davis Cup.

3 teams entered the Eastern Zone, with the winner going on to compete in the Inter-Zonal Zone against the winners of the America Zone and Europe Zone. India defeated Japan in the final and progressed to the Inter-Zonal Zone.

Draw

Semifinals

Ceylon vs. India

Final

Japan vs. India

References

External links
Davis Cup official website

Davis Cup Asia/Oceania Zone
Eastern Zone
Davis Cup
Davis Cup